The 2021 FIFA Arab Cup was the 10th edition of the Arab Cup, the Arab world's national team football tournament; it was the first edition under FIFA's jurisdiction. It took place between 30 November and 18 December in Qatar, as a prelude and test event to the 2022 FIFA World Cup which was also held in Qatar.

The tournament phase involved 16 teams, of which seven came through the qualifying round; all 23 teams competing were under the auspices of either the Asian Football Confederation (AFC) or the Confederation of African Football (CAF). Of the 16 teams, eight had also appeared in the 2012; no team made their debut appearance at the Arab Cup. The 32 finals matches were played in six venues, which were also used for the 2022 FIFA World Cup. Host nation Qatar beat Egypt in the third-place match. In the final, Algeria played Tunisia on 18 December at the Al Bayt Stadium in Al Khor. Algeria won the match 2–0 after extra time to claim their first Arab Cup.

Algerian player Yacine Brahimi was voted the tournament's best player, winning the Golden Ball. Tunisia's Seifeddine Jaziri won the Golden Boot as he scored the most goals during the tournament with four. Algeria's Raïs M'Bolhi won the Golden Glove, awarded to the goalkeeper with the most clean sheets. It has been estimated that more than 500,000 people attended games during the tournament. Semi-automated offside technology was tested for the first time in this tournament.

Teams

Of the 23 participating teams, the top nine teams based on the April 2021 FIFA Ranking directly qualified to the group stage, while the remaining 14 teams played seven single-leg matches, with seven teams going through to the group stage. In the group stage, there were four groups of four teams in a round-robin format, with the top two teams from each group qualifying to the knockout stage, which consisted of quarter-finals, semi-finals, a play-off for third place, and the final.

The 14 teams in the qualifiers were paired based on their April 2021 FIFA Ranking: the highest-ranked team in the qualifiers, Oman, played against the lowest-ranked team, Somalia. Lebanon, the second-highest ranked team, played against Djibouti, the second-lowest ranked team, and so on. The teams that won qualification matches 1, 2 and 3 occupied positions 2, 3 and 4 in pot 3, and the remaining teams were placed in pot 4 in order.

South Sudan forfeited their qualifying match due to the high number of COVID-19 cases among the South Sudan delegation. The Algerian FA decided in July 2020 to send the Algeria A' (local) team, however, their final squad included players from other Arab leagues to strengthen the team. The Moroccan FA also decided to send the Morocco A' (local) team, however, they also later strengthened the team with players from other Arab leagues.

Note: Numbers in parentheses indicate positions in the FIFA World Ranking at the time of the draw.

Draw
The group stage draw took place on 27 April 2021 at 21:00 AST at the Katara Opera House in Doha. It was conducted by Manolo Zubiria, FIFA's director of competitions, and four former players: Wael Gomaa (Egypt), Nawaf Al-Temyat (Saudi Arabia), Haitham Mustafa (Sudan) and Younis Mahmoud (Iraq).

Method 
The sixteen teams were drawn into four groups of four teams. The draw started with pot 1 and completed with pot 4, from where a team was drawn and assigned to the first available group in the position of their pot (i.e. position 1 for pot 1).

The hosts Qatar were automatically seeded into pot 1 and assigned to position A1, while the remaining automatically qualified teams were seeded into their respective pots based on the FIFA World Ranking of April 2021 (shown in parentheses below). Syria, the lowest-ranked team that automatically qualified, were joined in pot 3 by the winners of qualification matches 1 to 3, while pot 4 contained the winners of qualification matches 4 to 7. Algeria, as the winners of the 2019 Africa Cup of Nations, were assigned to position D1.

Squads

Only 15 players playing in non-Arab leagues were selected in the final 23-man squads: four in Sweden; two in England; one each in Denmark, Greece, Indonesia, Malaysia, Netherlands, Romania, Russia, Thailand and the United States.

Match officials
In October 2021, FIFA nominated 12 referees and 24 assistant referees from all six confederations, three from South America, two from Asia, Africa, North America and Europe, and one referee from Oceania. With the exception of Andrés Mattonte (Uruguay) and Facundo Tello (Argentina), all referees had previously officiated matches in a continental tournament. Iranian Alireza Faghani, Japanese Ryuji Sato, Gambian Bakary Gassama, Zambian Janny Sikazwe and New Zealander Matthew Conger also participated in the 2018 FIFA World Cup in Russia.

Candidate referees were used at least twice. Iranian referee Alireza Faghani officiated the opening match between Tunisia and Mauritania. Germany's Daniel Siebert was responsible for the final match between Tunisia and Algeria, and he is the most refereed referee for matches in the tournament with four matches.

Venues

Qualification
The 14 lowest-ranked teams in the FIFA World Ranking met on 7 April 2021, in a single knockout match. The best-ranked team met the lowest ranked team, the second-best played the second-lowest, and so on.

The match between Jordan and their opponents South Sudan was canceled, due to cases of COVID-19 infection for eight South Sudanese players. FIFA awarded a 3–0 victory in favor of Jordan.

Summary

|}

Matches
All times are local, AST (UTC+3).

Format
Of the 23 participating teams, the top nine teams based on the April 2021 FIFA World Ranking qualified directly to the group stage, while the remaining 14 teams played seven qualifying matches, of which seven qualified for the next stage. In the group stage, the teams were divided into four groups of four, with the two best teams from each group advancing to the quarter-finals.

Tiebreakers
The ranking of teams in the group stage is determined as follows:

 Points obtained in all group matches (three points for a win, one for a draw, none for a defeat);
 Goal difference in all group matches;
 Number of goals scored in all group matches;
 Points obtained in the matches played between the teams in question;
 Goal difference in the matches played between the teams in question;
 Number of goals scored in the matches played between the teams in question;
 Fair play points in all group matches (only one deduction could be applied to a player in a single match): 
 Drawing of lots.
The knockout stage included all stages from the quarter-finals to the final match. The winner of each match advances to the next stage and the loser is eliminated. The losing teams of the semi-finals played the match for third place. In the final match, the winner got the Arab Cup. In all final cases, if the match ends in a tie, then extra time will be played. If the score is still equal after extra time, it is decided by a penalty shoot-out.

Schedule 
All times are local, AST (UTC+3).

Group stage

Group A

Group B

Group C

Group D

Knockout stage

The knockout stage was the second and final stage of the tournament, after the group stage. It started on 10 December with the quarter-finals and ended on 18 December following the final match that was held at Al Bayt Stadium in Al Khor. The best two teams from each group (8 in total) advance to the knockout stage to compete in a singles-elimination tournament. A match for third place was played between the two losing teams in the semi-finals.

If the match is tied at the end of the original playing time, two halves of extra time will be played (15 minutes each) and followed, if necessary, by a penalty shoot-out to determine the winners. Below is an arc for the knockout stage of the tournament. Teams in bold indicate the winners of the match.

Bracket

Quarter-finals

Semi-finals

Third place play-off

Final

Statistics

Goalscorers

Awards
The following awards were given at the conclusion of the tournament.

Team of the Tournament
The Team of the Tournament is as follows:

Final ranking

The final ranking of the tournament is reported below.

Broadcasting rights

Sponsorship

See also
 2021 Arab Women's Cup

Notes

References

External links

 

 
2021
2021 in association football
2021 in African football
2021 in Asian football
2021–22 in Qatari football
2021 FIFA Arab Cup
November 2021 sports events in Asia
December 2021 sports events in Asia